Byron Nelson Award may refer to:
 PGA Tour - lowest adjusted scoring average for the year
 Champions Tour - lowest scoring average for the year